Mark Christiansen is a retired male badminton player from Denmark. He won the bronze medal at the 1985 IBF World Championships in men's doubles with Michael Kjeldsen.

Achievements

World Championships 
Men's doubles

IBF World Grand Prix 
The World Badminton Grand Prix sanctioned by International Badminton Federation (IBF) from 1983 to 2006.

Men's doubles

External links
Spillere med over 25 landskampe at Danish Badminton Federation

1963 births
Living people
Danish male badminton players
Sportspeople from Aalborg